Markus Oestreich (born 3 July 1963) is a German racing driver currently competing in the TCR International Series. He previously competed in the British Touring Car Championship, World Touring Car Championship and Deutsche Tourenwagen Meisterschaft.

Racing career
Oestreich began his career in 1985 in Formula Ford 2000 Germany, he finished 7th in the championship standings that year. Later he switched to the Deutsche Tourenwagen Meisterschaft, he raced in the championship for several years, ending the 1988 season 4th in the championship standings. From 1985–1987 he raced in the German Formula 3 championship. In 1986 he switched to the European Touring Car Championship, he ended 5th in the championship standings that year. He stayed in the championship up until 1988. In 1987 he also raced in the World Touring Car Championship, finishing the season 13th in the standings. Oestreich made his British Touring Car Championship debut in 1990, racing the 2 last rounds of the season. In 1994 he raced in the FIA Touring Car World Cup and the Super Tourenwagen Cup. In 2002 Oestreich raced in the V8Star Series, he finished the season 14th in the championship standings that year. In 2004 he won the SuperRace Truck category of the FIA European Truck Championship (which had cup status at that time). From 2010–2013 he raced in the FIA European Truck Racing Championship, he finished 3rd in the championship in 2013. In May 2015, it was announced that Oestreich would make his TCR International Series debut with Campos Racing driving an Opel Astra OPC.

Racing record

Complete Deutsche Tourenwagen Meisterschaft results
(key) (Races in bold indicate pole position) (Races in italics indicate fastest lap)

Complete European Touring Car Championship results

(key) (Races in bold indicate pole position) (Races in italics indicate fastest lap)

† Not eligible for points.

Complete World Touring Car Championship results
(key) (Races in bold indicate pole position) (Races in italics indicate fastest lap)

Complete British Touring Car Championship results
(key) (Races in bold indicate pole position in class) (Races in italics indicate fastest lap in class)

Complete Super Tourenwagen Cup results
(key) (Races in bold indicate pole position) (Races in italics indicate fastest lap)

Complete TCR International Series results
(key) (Races in bold indicate pole position) (Races in italics indicate fastest lap)

References

External links
 

1963 births
Living people
German racing drivers
European Touring Car Championship drivers
British Touring Car Championship drivers
World Touring Car Championship drivers
TCR International Series drivers
24 Hours of Daytona drivers
24H Series drivers
People from Fulda
Sportspeople from Kassel (region)
Campos Racing drivers
Schnitzer Motorsport drivers
Mercedes-AMG Motorsport drivers
Emil Frey Racing drivers
BMW M drivers
Josef Kaufmann Racing drivers
German Formula Three Championship drivers
Nürburgring 24 Hours drivers